Hayes is an unincorporated community in Gloucester County, Virginia, United States. Hayes has a post office with ZIP code 23072.

Hayes features many shopping centers, such as the York River Crossing shopping center, Hayes Plaza shopping center, and Hayes Stores shopping center, making it one of the two large commerce centers of Gloucester County with the other being Gloucester Courthouse.

The Shelly Archeological District was added to the National Register of Historic Places in 1990.

References

Unincorporated communities in Gloucester County, Virginia
Unincorporated communities in Virginia